Following are the results of the Ukrainian Football Amateur League 2007 season.  Participation was restricted to the regional (Oblast) champions and/or the most regarded team by the respective regional association. 

This season competition consisted of three stages.  The first stage was organized in regional principal and was played in two rounds where each team could play another at its home ground.  The second stage was played in three different places to identify the best six (Luzhany, Plysky, and Illichivsk). The games were organized in one round. The two best out of each group advanced to the semifinals where teams were split into two groups. The semifinals and the final were played in Illichivsk. The winners of the groups advanced to the finals and runners-up matched up in the game for the third place.

Teams

Returning
 Sokil Berezhany
 ODEK Orzhiv
 Podillia Khmelnytskyi

Debut
List of teams that are debuting this season in the league.

Halychyna Lviv, FC Luzhany, Budfarfor Slavuta, Avanhard Sutysky, OLKAR Sharhorod, Arsenal Bila Tserkva, Antares Obukhiv, Yednist-2 Plysky, Zirka Kirovohrad, Olimpik Kirovohrad, Bastion Illichivsk, Syhma Kherson, Donbas-Krym Donetsk

Withdrawn
List of clubs that took part in last year competition, but chose not to participate in 2007 season:

 Sokil Sukhovolia
 Illichivets Uman
 Elektrometalurh-NZF Nikopol

 Iskra-Podillia Teofipol
 Shakhtar Konotop
 Hirnyk Komsomolske

 Hran Buzova
 FC Bilyayivka

Location map

First stage

Group A

Group B

Group C

Group D

Group E

Second stage

(in Luzhany)

Group 1

(in Plysky)

Group 2
FC Yednist-2 Plysky - FC Lokomotyv Kupyansk 2:0
All participants of the group advanced farther.

(in Illichivsk)

Group 3

Semifinals

(in Illichivsk)

Group A

Group B

Final

The game took place in  Illichivsk, Odesa Oblast. September 29, 2007.

Bastion Illichivsk - Yednist-2 Plysky 4:0 (1:0)

Match for the 3rd place Luzhany - Lokomotyv Kupyansk 3:2 (1:1)

Ukrainian Football Amateur League seasons
Amateur
Amateur